Tombusvirus is a genus of viruses, in the family Tombusviridae. Plants serve as natural hosts. There are 17 species in this genus. Symptoms associated with this genus include mosaic. The name of the genus comes from Tomato bushy stunt virus.

Taxonomy
The genus contains the following species:
 Artichoke mottled crinkle virus
 Carnation Italian ringspot virus
 Cucumber Bulgarian virus
 Cucumber necrosis virus
 Cymbidium ringspot virus
 Eggplant mottled crinkle virus
 Grapevine Algerian latent virus
 Havel River virus
 Lato River virus
 Limonium flower distortion virus
 Moroccan pepper virus
 Neckar River virus
 Pelargonium leaf curl virus
 Pelargonium necrotic spot virus
 Petunia asteroid mosaic virus
 Sikte waterborne virus
 Tomato bushy stunt virus

Structure
Viruses in Tombusvirus are non-enveloped, with icosahedral and spherical geometries, and T=3 symmetry. The diameter is around 28-34 nm. Genomes are linear and non-segmented, positive sense, single-stranded RNA, around 4-5.4kb in length. These virions have a regular surface structure and are composed of 17% nucleic acid.

Life cycle
Viral replication is cytoplasmic, and is lysogenic. Entry into the host cell is achieved by penetration into the host cell. Replication follows the positive stranded RNA virus replication model. Positive stranded RNA virus transcription, using the premature termination model of subgenomic RNA transcription is the method of transcription. Translation takes place by suppression of termination. The virus exits the host cell by tubule-guided viral movement. Plants serve as the natural host. Transmission routes are mechanical, seed borne, and contact.

The virus uses the cis-regulatory elements, Tombus virus defective interfering (DI) RNA region 3 and Tombusvirus 5' UTR to control expression of defective interfering RNAs and viral RNA replication.

References

External links
 Viralzone: Tombusvirus
 ICTV
 Description of Plant Viruses
 International Committee on Taxonomy of Viruses
 University of Leicester Microbiology

Tombusviridae
Viral plant pathogens and diseases
Virus genera